is one of the major historical schools of Japanese painting. It was created in 17th century Kyoto by Hon'ami Kōetsu (1558–1637) and Tawaraya Sōtatsu (d. c.1643). Roughly fifty years later, the style was consolidated by brothers Ogata Kōrin (1658–1716) and Ogata Kenzan (1663–1743).

History

Hon'ami Kōetsu founded an artistic community of craftsmen supported by wealthy merchant patrons of the Nichiren Buddhist sect at Takagamine in northeastern Kyoto in 1615. Both the affluent merchant town elite and the old Kyoto aristocratic families favored arts which followed classical traditions, and Kōetsu obliged by producing numerous works of ceramics, calligraphy and lacquerware.

His collaborator, Tawaraya Sōtatsu, maintained an atelier in Kyoto and produced commercial paintings such as decorative fans and folding screens. Sōtatsu also specialized in making decorated paper with gold or silver backgrounds, to which Kōetsu assisted by adding calligraphy.

Both artists came from families of cultural significance; Kōetsu came from a family of swordsmiths who had served the imperial court and the great warlords, Oda Nobunaga and Toyotomi Hideyoshi, in addition to  the Ashikaga shōguns. Kōetsu's father evaluated swords for the Maeda clan, as did Kōetsu himself. However, Kōetsu was less concerned with swords as opposed to painting, calligraphy, lacquerwork, and the Japanese tea ceremony (he created several Raku ware tea bowls.) His own painting style was flamboyant, recalling the aristocratic style of the Heian period.

Sōtatsu also pursued the classical Yamato-e genre as Kōetsu, but pioneered a new technique with bold outlines and striking color schemes.

Later development

The Rinpa school was revived in the Genroku era (1688–1704) by Ogata Kōrin and his younger brother Ogata Kenzan, sons of a prosperous Kyoto textile merchant. Kōrin's innovation was to depict nature as an abstract using numerous color and hue gradations, and mixing colors on the surface to achieve eccentric effects, as well as liberal use of precious substances like gold and pearl.

His masterpiece  c. 1714–15, is now at the MOA Museum of Art in Atami, Shizuoka. A dramatic composition, it established the direction of Rinpa for the remainder of its history. Kōrin collaborated with Kenzan in painting designs and calligraphy on his brother's pottery. Kenzan remained as a potter in Kyoto until after Kōrin's death in 1716 when he began to paint professionally.  Other Rinpa artists active in this period were Tatebayashi Kagei, Tawaraya Sori, Watanabe Shiko, Fukae Roshu and Nakamura Hochu.

Modern Rinpa
Rinpa was revived in 19th century Edo by Sakai Hōitsu (1761–1828), a Kanō school artist whose family had been one of Ogata Kōrin’s sponsors. Sakai published a series of 100 woodcut prints based on paintings by Kōrin, and his painting  painted on the back of Kōrin’s "Wind and Thunder Gods screen" is now at the Tokyo National Museum.

Sakai had numerous students who carried the movement forward into the late 19th century, when it was incorporated into the Nihonga movement by Okakura Kakuzō and other painters. The influence of Rinpa was strong throughout the early modern period, and even today Rinpa-style designs are popular.  One later artist of note is Kamisaka Sekka.

Style
Rinpa artists worked in various formats, notably screens, fans and hanging scrolls, woodblock printed books, lacquerware, ceramics, and kimono textiles. Many Rinpa paintings were used on the sliding doors and walls (fusuma) of noble homes.

Subject matter and style were often borrowed from Heian period traditions of yamato-e, with elements from Muromachi ink paintings, Chinese Ming dynasty flower-and-bird paintings, as well as Momoyama-period Kanō school developments. The stereotypical standard painting in the Rinpa style involves simple natural subjects such as birds, plants and flowers, with the background filled in with gold leaf. This technique is known as gold ground. Emphasis on refined design and technique became more pronounced as the Rinpa style developed.
 
The Rinpa style flourished in Kyōto, Nara, and Ōsaka, i.e., the political and cultural triangle of ancient Japan. Kyōto and Ōsaka were also two of the most important cities of the Nanga (南画 "Southern painting"), also known as Bunjinga (文人画 "literati painting") school's style; Nanga painting was therefore exposed to the influence of Rinpa painting and vice versa.

Notable Rinpa artists 

 Hon'ami Kōetsu
 Tawaraya Sōtatsu
 Ogata Kōrin
 Ogata Kenzan
 Sakai Hōitsu
 Suzuki Kiitsu
 Kamisaka Sekka

Exhibitions 

 Rimpa: Outstanding Works of the Korin School (1972, October 10 - December 3) Tokyo National Museum, Tokyo
 Treasures by Rinpa Masters (2008, October 7 - November 16) Tokyo National Museum, Tokyo
 Korin: National Treasure Irises of the Nezu Museum and Eight-Bridge of The Metropolitan Museum of Art (2012, April 21 - May 20) Nezu Museum, Tokyo
 Designing Nature: The Rinpa Aesthetic in Japanese Art (2012-2013, May 26 - January 13) Metropolitan Museum of Art, New York City
 RINPA: The Aesthetics of the Capital (2015, October 10 - November 23) Kyoto National Museum, Kyoto
 Sōtatsu: Making Waves (2015-2016, October 24 - January 31) Arthur M. Sackler Gallery, Washington, D.C.
 Suzuki Kiitsu: Standard-bearer of the Edo Rimpa School (2016, September 10 - October 30) Suntory Museum of Art, Tokyo
 The Art of Edo Rimpa (2017, September 16 - November 7) Idemitsu Museum of Arts, Tokyo

References

Leach, Bernard. Kenzan and his tradition: The lives and times of Koetsu, Sotatsu, Korin, and Kenzan. Transatlantic Arts (1967). ASIN: B0006BPM10
Mizuo, Hiroshi. Edo Painting: Sotatsu and Korin (Heibonsha Survey of Japanese Art). Art Media Resources (1972). 
Saunders, Rachel. Le Japon Artistique: Japanese Floral Pattern Design of the Art Nouveau Era. From the Collection of the Museum of Fine Arts, Boston. Chronicle Books (2010). 
Stern, Harold P. Rinpa Masterworks of the Japanese Decorative School. The Japan Society (1971). ASIN B0000EEBUB
Stanley-Baker, Joan (1984). Japanese Art. London: Thames and Hudson Ltd.

External links
Bridge of dreams: the Mary Griggs Burke collection of Japanese art, a catalog from The Metropolitan Museum of Art Libraries (fully available online as PDF), which contains material on this school (see index)
 Japanese Lacquer, 1600-1900: Selections from the Charles A. Greenfield collection, a catalog from The Metropolitan Museum of Art Libraries (fully available online as PDF), for material on Rinpa see pages 55–84

 
Schools of Japanese art